The Babies was an American rock band from Brooklyn, New York City.

History
In 2008, Kevin Morby of Woods and Cassie Ramone of the Vivian Girls shared a small apartment in Clinton Hill, Brooklyn for a few months and wrote some songs. After meeting again in a house party, the two decided to start a band. The idea was to recapture the early, stress-free days of playing music before they were both in groups that had gained some success and created accompanying pressures. Despite the intention, nothing much came of the idea until the next winter when both bands again had a break. Justin Sullivan, who had played with Ramone in Bossy, began practicing with them on drums, and The Babies debuted as a three-piece in March 2009 at Dead Herring, their friends’ loft in Brooklyn. They played a few times before asking Nathanial Stark, formerly of Bent Outta Shape, to join on bass, and the full lineup’s first shows were in that summer.

The band released self-made tapes and singles for the small Wild World and Make a Mess labels before releasing their self-titled debut album for Shrimper in February 2011. They toured for much of the year, eventually replacing Stark with new bassist, Brian Schleyer. In early 2012, they left their Brooklyn home to record their second album in Los Angeles. Our House on the Hill was released on Woodsist late in the year.

In 2014, Cassie Ramone stated that the band is going to be "largely inactive" due to her focus on her own, as well as Morby's, solo careers.

Discography

Studio albums

Live albums

Extended plays

Mixtapes

Singles

Music videos

Band members

 Kevin Morby – vocals, guitar (2009–2014)
 Cassie Ramone – vocals, guitar (2009–2014)
 Nathanael Stark – bass (2009–2011)
 Brian Schleyer - bass (2012–2014)
 Justin Sullivan – drums (2009–2014)

References

External links
 

Garage rock groups from New York (state)
Indie rock musical groups from New York (state)
Musical groups from Brooklyn
Shrimper Records artists